Billy Coleman is an Irish motorsport rally driver. Nicknamed Millstreet Maestro, Billy Coleman is Ireland's most successful motorsport rally driver—in twenty years of racing he has claimed 29 victories, and won British Rally Championship and Irish Tarmac Rally Championship titles. He is the older brother of John Coleman who was a football player.

History 
Billy Coleman, a farmer native to Millstreet, Co. Cork still resides there today. He has developed an interest in cars from an early age, reminiscing how his father let him steer the car sitting on his knee at the age of five. His father Paddy Coleman was the Ford Main Dealer and owned a motor garage in Millstreet. Spending time at his father's garage further nurtured Billy's early interest in cars. Billy studied commerce in University College Cork, but preferred farming as his occupation, and undertook it full time after finishing up his racing career. His first racing car was Ford Cortina which Billy drove in 1967. In 1969 a crashed Ford Escort was acquired, repaired and converted into a rally car. In this car he's got everyone's attention the first time in 1969. Billy won the special stage in this tatty looking self-prepared green Ford Escort Mark I (TIU 250) ahead of the works Ford Escort of Roger Clark. Billy became famous in for his rallying skills all over Ireland as well as Britain, dominating the rallies in the 70s and 80s. He has also been seen in international arena, as far as Corsica and Monte Carlo. In his racing career Billy Coleman drove Ford Cortina, Ford Escort, Alpine-Renault, Lancia Stratos, Fiat-Abarth 131, Opel Manta 400, Porsche 911, Porsche 959, MG Metro 6R4 and BMW M3. Billy's two sons Robby Coleman and Gordon Coleman are also taking part in Irish and British racing events, with full their father's support.

Legacy

RTÉ Sports Hall of Fame Award 
In 2006, Coleman was awarded RTÉ Sports Hall of Fame Award for his outstanding achievements in rallying.

DVD 
Coleman holds the icon status in Irish racing, he features in Tarmac Titans DVD series on rally legends.

Billy Coleman young driver of the year award 
The Billy Coleman Award was conceived in 2000 by partnership of Motorsport Ireland, Sport Ireland and Team Ireland. The aim of the award is to motivate young Irish rally drivers to step up into the international arena and rival the achievements of the young Billy Coleman.

Influence on John Campion 
Irish-American billionaire, philanthropist, life-long motorsports supporter John Campion attributed much of his motivation to succeed to Billy Coleman's incredible achievements as a rally driver. John supported the launch of the Team Ireland Foundation in Dublin in 2016, where in his speech he said:As a young boy in Cork I found myself struggling with school and at a loss as to what I would do with my life. But I always felt a bond with motorsport after witnessing Billy Coleman, a farmer who became a world rallying icon, competing near my home in Cork. After seeing Billy rallying I realised then that if you put your mind to it, you could achieve anything.
John Campion emigrated to United States with $25 in his pocket to become the chairman and the CEO of an international energy corporation, and a philanthropist focusing on health, education and nutrition as well as sponsor of racing drivers through the his motorsports organization CJJ Motorsports. In his possession John had a collection of Lancia rally cars, inspired by Lancia Stratos HF driven by Billy Coleman in 1978.

Racing record 
Between his active racing years 1968 to 1987 Billy Coleman started in 128 national and international rally events and claimed 29 victories.

References 

Living people
1948 births
Irish rally drivers
European Rally Championship drivers
World Rally Championship drivers